Walter Cecil Crawley (29 March 1880 – 11 October 1940) was a British male tennis player.

Life
Crawley was born on 29 March 1880 and educated at St John's School, Leatherhead.  He competed in the singles and doubles at the 1908 Summer Olympics. In the doubles he reached the quarterfinals with Kenneth Powell in which they lost to compatriots and eventual Olympic champions George Hillyard and Reginald Doherty.

His brother, Alfred Ernest Crawley was also a tennis player.

References

External links

1880 births
1940 deaths
Olympic tennis players of Great Britain
Tennis players at the 1908 Summer Olympics
People from Masham
English male tennis players
British male tennis players
Tennis people from North Yorkshire
People educated at St John's School, Leatherhead